Thornlea railway station was a station in Ontario, Canada served by CN commuter trains bound for Capreol/Parry Sound. The station was 16 miles north of Toronto Union. The station closed when CN's commuter services through the Bala Subdivision were discontinued. 

GO Transit's Richmond hill line operates services through the station's site but trains don't call at Thornlea station, instead calling at new stations in Old Cummer and Langstaff.

References

External links 
PDF File Richmond Hill Line : https://www.gotransit.com/static_files/gotransit/assets/pdf/TripPlanning/FullSchedules/FS26062021/Table61.pdf

Crash that happened in Thornlea railway station http://www.cnr-in-ontario.com/Database/DisplayArticle.php?stationID=307

Main page on CNR from where most references were from http://www.cnr-in-ontario.com/Articles/index.html

Thornhill, Ontario
Railway stations in Markham, Ontario
Canadian National Railway stations in Ontario